Thrush may refer to:

Arts, entertainment, and media
 THRUSH, an organization in the television program The Man from U.N.C.L.E.
 Mistle Thrush (band), an alternative rock band based in Boston, Massachusetts
 Thrush Hermit, a Canadian alternative rock band active in the 1990s
 The Deception of the Thrush: A Beginners' Guide to ProjeKcts, a King Crimson album
 Tiger Thrush, an album by Japanese vocalist Ami Yoshida

Birds
 Thrush (bird), any of the birds in the family Turdidae
 Antthrush, any of the birds in the family Formicariidae
 Dohrn's thrush-babbler (Horizorhinus dohrni), a species of bird in the family Timalidae
 Laughingthrush, any of the birds in the genus Garrulax, in the family Timalidae
 Palm thrush, any of the birds in the genus Cichladusa in the family Muscapidae
 Quail-thrush, any of the birds in the genus Cinclosoma, in the family Cinclosomatidae
 Rock thrush, any of the birds in the genus Monticola in the family Muscapidae
 Rosy thrush-tanager (Rhodinocichla rosea), a species of bird in the family Thraupidae
 Shrikethrush, any of the birds in the family Colluricinclidae
 Spotted thrush-babbler (Ptyrticus turdinus), a species of bird in the family Timaliidae
 Thrush nightingale (Luscinia luscinia), a species of bird in the family Muscapidae
 Thrush-like antpitta (Myrmothera campanisona), a species of bird in the Formicariidae
 Thrush-like schiffornis (Schiffornis turdina), a species of bird in the family Tityridae
 Thrush-like woodcreeper or plain-winged woodcreeper (Dendrocincla turdina), a species of bird in the family Furnariidae
 Thrush-like wren (Campylorhynchus turdinus), a species of bird in the family Troglodytidae
 True thrush, any of the birds in the genus Turdus, e.g.
 Mistle thrush (Turdus viscivorus) 
 Song thrush (Turdus philomelos), also known as "throstle" or "mavis"

Medicine 
 Thrush (horse), a bacterial infection of the sole of a horse's hoof
 Thrush (or candidiasis), a fungal infection with Candida species, which can specifically refer to:
 (Oral) thrush (oral candidiasis), candidiasis of the mouth
 (Vaginal) thrush (candidal vulvovaginitis), candidiasis of the vagina and vulva

People
 Jeremy Thrush, New Zealand rugby player
 Peter Dengate Thrush (born 1956), New Zealand barrister

Transport
 Ayres Thrush, an agricultural aircraft
 Blackburne Thrush, an early engine for light aircraft
 Curtiss Thrush, an early single-engined airliner, the basis for the twin-engined Curtiss Kingbird
 , three ships of the British Royal Navy
 Thrush, a brand of automotive exhaust mufflers (silencers) made by Tenneco corporation
 Thrush Aircraft, a US aircraft manufacturer
 , two ships of the United States Navy

Other uses
 Thrush (racehorse), a Thoroughbred racehorse
 Thrush, an informal term for a female singer
 Thrush or Drozd, a military missile system developed in the Soviet Union

Animal common name disambiguation pages